Galeria Valeria (died 315) was the daughter of Roman Emperor Diocletian and wife of his co-emperor Galerius.

Biography
Born as Valeria to Diocletian and Prisca, she married Galerius in 293, when her father elevated him to the position of Caesar. This marriage was clearly organized to strengthen the bonds between the two emperors.

Valeria was raised to the title of Augusta and Mater Castrorum in November 308. Since Galerius fathered no child with her, Valeria adopted her husband's illegitimate son, Candidianus, as her own. In her honor, Galerius renamed the province of Upper Pannonia Valeria, which he had improved by draining marshes and removing forests.

When Galerius died, in 311, Licinius was entrusted with the care of Valeria and her mother Prisca. The two women, however, fled from Licinius to Maximinus Daia, whose daughter was betrothed to Candidianus. After a short time, Valeria refused the marriage proposal of Maximinus, who arrested and confined her in Syria and confiscated her properties. At the death of Maximinus, Licinius ordered the death of both women. Valeria and Prisca fled, hiding for a year, until they were recognized by residents in Thessaloniki. She and her mother were captured by Licinius' soldiers, beheaded in the central square of the city, and their bodies thrown in the sea.

Valeria was sympathetic towards Christians, while Galerius persecuted them. She was canonized as a Christian saint with her mother (see Saint Alexandra).

Gallery

See also
 Women in ancient Rome

References

External links 

 "Prisca, Galeria Valeria, and Candidianus", s.v. "Diocletian", De Imperatoribus Romanis.

3rd-century births
315 deaths
Galeria
Murdered Roman empresses
3rd-century Roman women
4th-century Roman empresses
Year of birth unknown
Augustae
Deaths by decapitation
Valerii
Diocletian
266 births
Daughters of Roman emperors